The state funeral of Victoria, Queen of the United Kingdom of Great Britain and Ireland, Empress of India, occurred on 2 February 1901, after her death on 22 January. It was one of the largest gatherings of European royalty.

Description

In 1897, Victoria had written instructions for her funeral, which was to be military as befitting a soldier's daughter and the head of the army, and feature white dress instead of black. On 25 January, her body was lifted into the coffin by her sons Edward VII and Prince Arthur, Duke of Connaught, and her grandson the German Emperor Wilhelm II. She was dressed in a white dress and her wedding veil. An array of mementos commemorating her extended family, friends and servants were laid in the coffin with her, at her request, by her doctor and dressers. A dressing gown that had belonged to her husband Albert who had died 40 years earlier, was placed by her side, along with a plaster cast of his hand, while a lock of John Brown's hair, along with a picture of him, was placed in her left hand concealed from the view of the family by a carefully positioned bunch of flowers. Items of jewellery placed on Victoria included the wedding ring of John Brown's mother, given to her by Brown in 1883. Her funeral was held on Saturday, 2 February, in St George's Chapel, Windsor Castle, and after two days of lying-in-state, she was interred beside Prince Albert in the Royal Mausoleum at Frogmore at Windsor Great Park.

The state funeral of Queen Victoria took place in February 1901; it had been 64 years since the last burial of a monarch. Victoria left strict instructions regarding the service and associated ceremonies and instituted a number of changes, several of which set a precedent for state (and indeed ceremonial) funerals that have taken place since. First, she disliked the preponderance of funereal black; henceforward, there would be no black cloaks, drapes or canopy, and Victoria requested a white pall for her coffin. Second, she expressed a desire to be buried as "a soldier's daughter". The procession, therefore, became much more a military procession, with the peers, privy counsellors and judiciary no longer taking part en masse. Her pallbearers were equerries rather than dukes (as had previously been customary), and for the first time, a gun carriage was employed to convey the monarch's coffin. Third, Victoria requested that there should be no public lying in state. This meant that the only event in London on this occasion was a gun carriage procession from one railway station to another: Victoria having died at Osborne House on the Isle of Wight, her body was conveyed by boat and train to Victoria Station, then by gun carriage to Paddington Station and then by train to Windsor for the funeral service itself. 

The rare sight of a state funeral cortège travelling by ship provided a striking spectacle: Victoria's body was carried on board HMY Alberta from Cowes to Gosport, with a suite of yachts following conveying the new king, Edward VII, and other mourners. Minute guns were fired by the assembled fleet as the yacht passed by. Victoria's body remained on board ship overnight before being conveyed by gun carriage to Gosport railway station the following day for the train journey to London. Victoria broke convention by having a white draped coffin.

At Windsor, when the royal coffin was loaded atop the gun carriage for the procession and the artillery horses took the weight, granddaughter of Queen Victoria Princess Alice, Countess of Athlone said the day was very cold and "nothing in the world would make them start". An attendant Royal Guard from HMS Excellent was shortly then ordered to haul the gun carriage with ropes instead, a disruption which subsequently became state funeral tradition. She further observed that the Royal Artillery, responsible for the horses and the gun carriage, "were furious... humiliated beyond words" by the incident.

Victoria's children had married into the great royal families of Europe and a number of foreign monarchs were in attendance including Wilhelm II of Germany as well as the heir-presumptive to the Austro-Hungarian throne Archduke Franz Ferdinand.

Funeral service
The service in the afternoon of Saturday 2 February at St George's Chapel followed the liturgy of the Burial Service in the Book of Common Prayer and was the first royal funeral for which a printed order of service had been produced. The organisation of the service lay with the Dean of Windsor and the Lord Chamberlain, with the active participation of the Archbishops of Canterbury and York. The music started with the first of the funeral sentences by William Croft and Psalm 15 to a setting by William Felton. After the lesson came further funeral sentences sung as anthems; Man that is born by Samuel Sebastian Wesley and Thou knowest Lord by Henry Purcell. The Lord's Prayer in Latin by Charles Gounod, and the anthem How blest are they by Pyotr Ilyich Tchaikovsky followed. After the Garter Principal King of Arms had proclaimed the Queen's styles and titles, the anthem Blest are the departed by Louis Spohr was reportedly followed by the Dresden amen. The inclusion of so much music by foreign composers was unprecedented and was not repeated in later royal funerals where British music predominated. At the end of the service, the funeral march attributed to Ludwig van Beethoven but actually by Johann Heinrich Walch was played instead of the traditional "Dead March" from Saul because Victoria was known to dislike Handel's music and was reported to have forbidden its use at her funeral.

Interment service
The interment at the nearby Frogmore Mausolem was held two days after the funeral on 4 February. The procession from St George's Chapel was accompanied by massed military bands playing funeral marches, but in the final part of the journey, pipers played a lament, the Black Watch Dead March. Arriving at the mausoleum, the choir of St George's sang Yea, thou I walk from Sir Arthur Sullivan's oratorio, The Light of the World. This was followed by the funeral sentences by Wesley and Purcell that had been sung at the funeral, Lord have mercy by Thomas Tallis and Gounoud's Lord's Prayer. A hymn, Sleep thy last sleep, preceded the conluding prayers read by the Dean of Windsor, after which Sullivan's anthem, The face of death and Sir John Stainer's Sevenfold Amen concluded the service.

Guests
As per report in London Gazette.

Immediate family
 The King and Queen of the United Kingdom, the late Queen's son and daughter-in-law
 The Duchess of Cornwall and York, the late Queen's granddaughter-in-law
 The Princess Louise, Duchess of Fife and The Duke of Fife, the late Queen's granddaughter and grandson-in-law
 The Princess Victoria, the late Queen's granddaughter
 Princess and Prince Charles of Denmark, the late Queen's granddaughter and grandson-in-law
 The Duchess of Saxe-Coburg and Gotha (Duchess of Edinburgh), the late Queen's daughter-in-law
 The Crown Prince of Romania, the late Queen's grandson-in-law (representing the King of the Romanians)
 The Hereditary Prince of Hohenlohe-Langenburg, the late Queen's grandson-in-law and half-great-nephew
 Princess Beatrice of Saxe-Coburg and Gotha, the late Queen's granddaughter
 The Duke and Duchess of Connaught and Strathearn, the late Queen's son and daughter-in-law
 Princess Margaret of Connaught, the late Queen's granddaughter
 Prince Arthur of Connaught, the late Queen's grandson
 Princess Patricia of Connaught, the late Queen's granddaughter
 The Duchess of Albany, the late Queen's daughter-in-law
 Princess Alice of Albany, the late Queen's granddaughter
 The Duke of Saxe-Coburg and Gotha (Duke of Albany), the late Queen's grandson
 The Empress Frederick, Queen Mother of Prussia's family:
 The German Emperor, the late Queen's grandson
 The German Crown Prince, the late Queen's great-grandson
 The Hereditary Prince of Saxe-Meiningen, the late Queen's grandson-in-law (representing the Duke of Saxe-Meiningen)
 Prince Heinrich XXX of Reuss-Köstritz, the late Queen's great-grandson-in-law (representing the Prince Reuss Younger Line)
 Prince Henry of Prussia, the late Queen's grandson
 Princess and Prince Adolf of Schaumburg-Lippe, the late Queen's granddaughter and grandson-in-law (representing the Prince of Schaumburg-Lippe)
 The Duke of Sparta, the late Queen's grandson-in-law
 Prince Frederick Charles of Hesse, the late Queen's grandson-in-law
 Grand Duchess Alice of Hesse and by Rhine's family:
 Princess and Prince Louis of Battenberg, the late Queen's granddaughter and grandson-in-law The Grand Duke of Hesse and by Rhine, the late Queen's grandson Princess and Prince Christian of Schleswig-Holstein, the late Queen's daughter and son-in-law Prince Albert of Schleswig-Holstein, the late Queen's grandson Princess Helena Victoria of Schleswig-Holstein, the late Queen's granddaughter Princess Marie Louise of Schleswig-Holstein, the late Queen's granddaughter The Princess Louise, Duchess of Argyll and The Duke of Argyll, the late Queen's daughter and son-in-law Princess Henry of Battenberg, the late Queen's daughter Prince Alexander of Battenberg, the late Queen's grandsonOther descendants of the late Queen's paternal grandfather, King George III and their families: The Duke of Cambridge, the late Queen's first cousin The Grand Duchess of Mecklenburg-Strelitz's family: Duke Adolphus Frederick of Mecklenburg-Strelitz, the late Queen's first cousin twice removed (representing the Grand Duke of Mecklenburg-Strelitz)
 Princess Mary Adelaide, Duchess of Teck's family: The Duke of Teck, the late Queen's first cousin once removed Prince Francis of Teck, the late Queen's first cousin once removed Prince Alexander of Teck, the late Queen's first cousin once removed Baron Alphons von Pawel-Rammingen, husband of the late Queen's first cousin once removed The Hon. Aubrey FitzClarence, the late Queen's double first cousin twice removedExtended family
 The Prince of Hohenlohe-Langenburg, the late Queen's half-nephew Count Edward Gleichen, the late Queen's half-great-nephew The Duke of Schleswig-Holstein, the late Queen's half-great-nephew The King of the Belgians, the late Queen's first cousin Prince Philipp of Saxe-Coburg and Gotha, the late Queen's first cousin once removed Prince Leopold Clement of Saxe-Coburg and Gotha, the late Queen's double first cousin twice removed The King of Portugal, the late Queen's first cousin twice removed Duke Robert of Württemberg, the late Queen's first cousin twice removed'' (representing the King of Württemberg)

Other foreign royalty
 The King of the Hellenes
 The Crown Prince of Denmark (representing the King of Denmark)
 The Crown Prince of Sweden and Norway (representing the King of Sweden and Norway)
 Archduke Franz Ferdinand of Austria (representing the Austrian Emperor)
 Grand Duke Michael Alexandrovich of Russia (representing the Russian Emperor)
 The Duke of Aosta (representing the King of Italy)
 The Crown Prince of Siam (representing the King of Siam)
 The Duke of Saxony (representing the King of Saxony)
 The Hereditary Grand Duke of Baden (representing the Grand Duke of Baden)
 Prince Arnulf of Bavaria (representing the Prince Regent of Bavaria)
 Prince Edward of Saxe-Weimar (representing the Grand Duke of Saxe-Weimar-Eisenach)
 The Prince of Waldeck and Pyrmont
 The Prince of Hohenzollern
 Prince Mohammed Ali Tewfik (representing the Khedive of Egypt and Sudan)
 Prince Ernst of Saxe-Altenburg (representing the Duke of Saxe-Altenburg)

Nobility
 The Duke of Norfolk
 The Duke and Duchess of Buccleuch
 The Duke of Northumberland
 The Duke of Beaufort
 The Duke of Montrose
 The Duke of Portland
 The Marquess of Londonderry
 The Earl Waldegrave
 The Earl of Clarendon
 The Earl of Pembroke
 The Earl of Harewood
 The Earl of Haddington
 The Earl Cawdor
 The Earl Howe
 The Earl of Kintore
 The Earl of Gosford
 The Earl of Denbigh
 The Countess of Lytton
 The Viscount Valentia
 The Viscount Galway
 The Viscount Wolseley
 The Lord Roberts
 The Lord Belper
 The Baron Lawrence
 The Lord Colville of Culross
 The Lord Churchill 
 Earl of Kerry
 Earl of March
 Lord William Cecil
 Victor Cavendish

See also
 Death and state funeral of Edward VII
 Death and state funeral of George V
 Death and state funeral of George VI
 Death and state funeral of Elizabeth II
 State funerals in the United Kingdom

References

Queen Victoria
1901 in Europe
1901 in London
1901 in the United Kingdom
European court festivities
Events involving British royalty
February 1901 events
Victoria
Victoria